John Browne (1582 – 16 May 1659) was an English lawyer who sat in the House of Commons at various times between 1621 and 1653. He supported the Parliamentary cause in the English Civil War.

Browne was the son of John Browne of Frampton, Dorset. He matriculated at Magdalen College, Oxford, on 13 October  1598, aged 16. He was a student of the Middle Temple in 1599. In 1621, he was elected as a Member of Parliament for Bridport. He was re-elected as one of the members for Bridport in 1628, but his election was declared void on 12 April. In June 1641 he was elected for Dorset in the Long Parliament and sat until 1653, surviving Pride's Purge in 1648. He was appointed as a commissioner for the trial of the King in 1649, but did not act.

Browne died at the age of 78.

References

1582 births
1659 deaths
Alumni of Magdalen College, Oxford
Members of the Middle Temple
Roundheads
Politicians from Dorset
English MPs 1621–1622
English MPs 1628–1629
English MPs 1640–1648
English MPs 1648–1653